Esetar is a rural locality (a selo) in Kilersky Selsoviet, Dokuzparinsky District, Republic of Dagestan, Russia. The population was 54 as of 2010. There are 2 streets.

Geography 
Esetar is located 5 km south of Usukhchay (the district's administrative centre) by road. Gandurar and Demirar are the nearest rural localities.

Nationalities 
Lezgins live there.

References 

Rural localities in Dokuzparinsky District